Hicham M'Laab (born 27 February 1990) is a French footballer who plays for Bergerac Périgord FC.

Career
M'Laab started his career with academy of Rennes in 2005, winning the Coupe Gambardella in 2008 with the youth team. He left Rennes in 2010, signing for Pau. In 2013 he signed for Lens, being given an opportunity to earn a first team place in the reserves, but the chance never came and he returned to Pau in 2014.

In June 2015 he signed for Nantes and made his Ligue 1 debut on 28 November 2015 against SC Bastia. He signed his first professional contract with the club at the start of 2016.

In June 2017 he signed for the reserve team of Paris Saint-Germain in Championnat National 2. In July 2018 he moved to AS Vitré.

In January 2019, he signed a five-month contract with Avranches.

Personal life
Born in France, M'Laab is of Moroccan descent.

References

1990 births
Living people
Association football midfielders
French footballers
French sportspeople of Moroccan descent
Ligue 1 players
Championnat National players
Championnat National 2 players
Pau FC players
FC Nantes players
AS Vitré players
US Avranches players